Azor Betts (September 13, 1740 – September 14, 1809) was an American Loyalist doctor who began his practice in the Province of New York before the American Revolutionary War. His staunch defense of smallpox inoculation and support of the Loyalist cause led to his arrest and eventual departure to Canada.

Life before the Revolution
Azor Betts was born on September 13, 1740, in Norwalk, Connecticut, the son of Nathan Betts and Mary Belden. He married Gloriana Purdy in 1765 in Rye, New York, and practiced medicine in New York City prior to the Revolutionary War.

The Revolution and smallpox
The events of 1776 that began open hostility between the Continental Army and the British Army in America were tempered by outbreaks of smallpox that began the year previous. General George Washington of the Continentals ordered on May 20, 1776, that no man in his army be inoculated with smallpox, or face serious punishment. Betts first administered smallpox to members of the Continental Army mere days after the order was given, and was placed under arrest by local authorities. Testimony during a hearing on the matter before the New York Committee of Safety on May 26, 1776, was given by both Doctor Foster representing the prosecution and Betts in his defense. Doctor Foster testified that:

In his defense, Betts told the Committee that:

As a reaction to the news that Betts had performed these inoculations in New York, Washington, immediately drew up another order, this time spelling out the punishment for any soldier caught being inoculated with smallpox:

Jailed again for more smallpox inoculations, Betts became an open Loyalist, serving as both a Captain-Lieutenant in the Kings American Regiment and also as a surgeon for the Queen's Rangers. In May 1783, Betts left America for good, making his home in Kingston, New Brunswick.

Life in Canada
Soon after arriving in Kingston, Betts created isolation wards for those infected with smallpox. He continued this practice, and when the smallpox vaccine was introduced in 1802, he vaccinated local citizens free of charge.

Betts died of consumption in Digby, Nova Scotia, in 1809, one day after his 69th birthday. He is buried in the cemetery of the Trinity Anglican Church there.

The inscription on a tombstone erected and later renewed by his family cites a different date for his death and burial place. A grave stone at the Old Loyalist Burial Grounds in Saint John, New Brunswick, is inscribed  "In Memory of Dr Azor Betts Died Sept 15, 1811, aged 72 years. Also his wife Gloriannah, died March 16, 1815, aged 68 years."

See also
 Vaccine
 Vaccination
 Inoculation
 History of science

References

1740 births
1809 deaths
People from Norwalk, Connecticut
United Empire Loyalists
Physicians in the American Revolution
18th-century American physicians
Loyalists in the American Revolution from Connecticut
American emigrants to pre-Confederation New Brunswick
19th-century Canadian physicians
Smallpox
19th-century deaths from tuberculosis
Tuberculosis deaths in Canada